Jodi Magness (born September 19, 1956) is an archaeologist, orientalist and scholar of religion. She serves as the Kenan Distinguished Professor for Teaching Excellence in Early Judaism at the University of North Carolina at Chapel Hill. She previously taught at Tufts University.

Early life and education 
Magness received her B.A. in Archaeology and History from the Hebrew University of Jerusalem (1977), and her Ph.D. in Classical Archaeology from the University of Pennsylvania (1989).

Academic career 
From 1990 to 1992, Magness was Mellon Post-Doctoral Fellow in Syro-Palestinian Archaeology at the Center for Old World Archaeology and Art at Brown University. She also taught at Tufts University before joining the University of North Carolina at Chapel Hill, where she is Kenan Distinguished Professor for Teaching Excellence in Early Judaism.

Magness has participated in 20 different excavations in Israel and Greece. She co-directed the 1995 excavations of the Roman siege works at Masada. From 1997 to 1999 she co-directed excavations at Khirbet Yattir in Israel. Since 2003 Professor Magness has been the co-director of the excavations in the late Roman fort at Yotvata, Israel. In 2011 she began to dig at Huqoq.

Magness is a popular professor whose "unique teaching style of using vivid anecdotes [keeps] students on the edge of their seats".

Magness has strongly criticized the docu-drama The Lost Tomb of Jesus  of James Cameron and Simcha Jacobovici, stating that "at the time of Jesus, wealthy families buried their dead in tombs cut by hand from solid rock, putting the bones in niches in the walls and then, later, transferring them to ossuaries". Whereas "Jesus came from a poor family that, like most Jews of the time, probably buried their dead in ordinary graves. If Jesus' family had been wealthy enough to afford a rock-cut tomb, it would have been in Nazareth, not Jerusalem", she said. Magness also said the names on the Talpiyot ossuaries "indicate that the tomb belonged to a family from Judea, the area around Jerusalem, where people were known by their first name and father's name. As Galileans, Jesus and his family members would have used their first name and hometown."

Magness has been a guest on the National Geographic Channel's The Story of God with Morgan Freeman, a documentary television series exploring religious beliefs across cultures around the world.

Honors and awards
She was American Academy of Arts and Sciences Fellow of 2019.

Books
Jodi Magness, as an author, has published various works:
 The Archaeology of Qumran and the Dead Sea Scrolls, 2nd ed. (Grand Rapids, MI: Eerdmans, 2021)
 Masada: From Jewish Revolt to Modern Myth, Princeton University Press (May 14, 2019)
 Stone and Dung, Oil and Spit: Jewish Daily Life in the Time of Jesus (Grand Rapids, MI: Eerdmans, 2011)
 The Archaeology of the Early Islamic Settlement in Palestine (Winona Lake, IN: Eisenbrauns, 2003), 2006 Irene Levi-Sala Book Prize.
 The Archaeology of Qumran and the Dead Sea Scrolls (Grand Rapids, MI: Eerdmans, 2002) – winner of the 2003 Biblical Archaeology Society's Award for Best Popular Book in Archaeology and an “Outstanding Academic Book for 2003” by Choice Magazine.
 Debating Qumran: Collected Essays on Its Archaeology (Leuven: Peeters, 2004); Hesed ve-Emet, Studies in Honor of Ernest S. Frerichs (co-edited with S. Gitin; Atlanta: Scholars Press, 1998)
 Jerusalem Ceramic Chronology circa 200–800 C.E. (Sheffield: Sheffield Academic, 1993)

See also
 Upper Zohar

References

External links
 Official site
 Biography

Qumran
American biblical scholars
Living people
1956 births
University of North Carolina at Chapel Hill faculty
Hebrew University of Jerusalem alumni
University of Pennsylvania alumni
Tufts University faculty
American archaeologists
American orientalists
Female biblical scholars
American women archaeologists
American women academics
21st-century American women
Members of the Jesus Seminar
Presidents of the Archaeological Institute of America